Nelukkulam Kalaimagal Maha Vidyalayam is a provincial school in Nelukkulam near Vavuniya, Sri Lanka.

See also
 List of schools in Northern Province, Sri Lanka

References

External links
 Nelukkulam Kalaimagal Maha Vidyalayam

Educational institutions established in 1888
Provincial schools in Sri Lanka
Schools in Vavuniya District
1888 establishments in Ceylon